Andrea R. Bendewald (born March 4, 1970) is an American actress. She is best known for her role as Maddy Piper on Suddenly Susan.

Early life and education
Born in New York City, Bendewald is the daughter of Judith and Mervin Bendewald, a clothing store owner. She has a brother, Mason Bendewald.

Bendewald attended the High School of Performing Arts and later earned a Bachelor of Fine Arts degree from Wright State University.

Career
In addition to performing in film, stage, and television, Bendewald also teaches acting in the Professional Programs at the UCLA School of Theater, Film and Television. She also founded The Art of Circling, a self-improvement and spiritual program.

Personal life
In October 1998, Bendewald met actor Mitch Rouse on the set of The Secret Lives of Men. They married on August 19, 2001, at the Saddlerock Ranch in Malibu, California. The couple have two children. She has one dog named Bonnie.

She is the best friend of Jennifer Aniston since the two met in Manhattan's High School for the Performing Arts.

Filmography

Awards and nominations
Ovation Awards
2011: Nominated for Featured Actress in a Play for the role of Jane in "Girls Talk"

References

External links

1970 births
20th-century American actresses
21st-century American actresses
American acting coaches
Actresses from New York City
American film actresses
American television actresses
Fiorello H. LaGuardia High School alumni
Living people
UCLA School of Theater, Film and Television faculty
Wright State University alumni